Scymnus frontalis is a species of beetle in the family Coccinellidae. It is found in southern Britain.

They feed on aphids and live in low growing vegetation. They are typically 2.6 to 3.2 mm in length.

References 

Coccinellidae
Beetles described in 1787